We Are One is the fifth studio album and sixth overall album by  Bay Area-based R&B group Maze. It was released in 1983 on Capitol Records.

Track listing
All songs written by Frankie Beverly.

"Love Is the Key"	4:26 	
"Right on Time" 	6:11 	
"Your Own Kind of Way" 	5:13 	
"I Wanna Thank You" 	5:26 	
"We Are One" 	6:30 	
"Never Let You Down" 	5:21 	
"I Love You Too Much" 	6:13
"Metropolis" 	0:43

Charts

Singles

External links
 Maze Featuring Frankie Beverly -We Are One at Discogs

References

1983 albums
Maze (band) albums
Capitol Records albums